The Irish community is one of New York City's major and important ethnic groups, and has been a significant proportion of the city's population since the waves of immigration in the late 19th century.

As a result of the Great Famine in Ireland, many Irish families were forced to emigrate from the country. By 1854, between 1.5 and 2 million Irish had left their country. In the United States, most Irish became city-dwellers. With little money, many had to settle in the cities that the ships landed in. By 1850, the Irish made up a quarter of the population in Boston, New York City, Philadelphia, Buffalo, and Baltimore.

Today, Boston has the largest percentage of Irish-Americans of any city in the United States, while New York City has the most Irish Americans in raw numbers. During the Celtic Tiger years, when the Irish economy was booming, the city saw a buying spree of residences by native Irish as second homes or as investment property.

History

Irish Americans (most of whom are Irish Catholic) make up approximately 5.3% of New York City's population, composing the second largest non-Hispanic white ethnic group.  Irish American Protestants first came to America in colonial years (pre-1776).The largest wave of Catholic Irish immigration came after the Great Famine in 1845.  Most came from some of Ireland's most populous counties, such as Cork, Galway, and Tipperary. Large numbers also originated in counties Cavan, Meath, Dublin, and Laois.

In the Civil War, the massive anti-draft riots of 1863 represented a "civil war" inside the Irish Catholic community, according to Toby Joyce.  The mostly Irish Catholic rioters confronted police, soldiers, and pro-war politicians who were often leaders of the Irish community. 
In the "early days", the 19th century, the Irish formed a predominant part of the European immigrant population of New York City, a "city of immigrants", which added to the city's diversity to this day. After they came, Irish immigrants often crowded into subdivided homes, only meant for one family, and cellars, attics, and alleys all became home for the poorest immigrants. As they accumulated wealth they moved into better housing.  Bay Ridge, Brooklyn, was originally developed as a resort for wealthy Manhattanites in 1879, but instead became an upscale  family-oriented Italian- and Irish-American community.  Another large Irish-American community is located in  Woodlawn Heights, Bronx, but Woodlawn Heights also has a mix of different ethnic groups. Conditions were slow to improve in Manhattan's  Hell's Kitchen.

Other sizable Irish-American communities include Belle Harbor and Breezy Point, both in Queens. Two big Irish communities are Marine Park and neighboring Gerritsen Beach. The Irish have also settled "to a far lesser extent [in] Maspeth, Woodside, and Sunnyside, Queens."

The Irish Catholic men were successful in joining the New York City Police Department as well as the New York Fire Department.  Religious women became nuns teaching in parochial schools; others became public school teachers. In the neighborhoods, the Irish organized to again control over territory, jobs, and political organizations. As the "new immigrants" from Southern and Eastern Europe arrived 1880s-1914, the Irish incorporating them into their established system. It was a process of "Americanization." The Irish dominated the Catholic Church as bishops, priests, pastors and nuns.  The Church worked hard to keep Catholicism strong among the new arrivals, opening parish schools and high schools.
After 1945, a large-scale movement to the suburbs was made possible by the steady upward social mobility of the Irish.

Irish colleges and universities 
Fordham University Founded by Archbishop John Hughes an Irish immigrant, and built by Irish labor. Most of the Jesuits are Irish-Americans and Irish Americans make up a sizeable amount of the student body. The University president Rev. Joseph McShane, SJ is an Irish American.
St. John's University Founded by Bishop John Laughlin an Irish immigrant aiming to educate Irish and other immigrants in a strong Catholic atmosphere. Almost every president of the University has been an Irish American, and many of the Vincentian priests that run the University are Irish as well as lay staff and professors. The University president Rev. Brian Shanley, OP is an Irish American. 
Manhattan College A large amount of the student body, staff and professors are Irish American. Its athletic teams are named the Jaspers, in honor of Brother Jasper of Mary, an Irish immigrant, administrator at the school and inventor of the seventh inning stretch. The College president Brennan O'Donnell, is an Irish American.

Irish neighborhoods

Current
Woodlawn, Bronx
 North Riverdale, Bronx
City Island, Bronx
 Pelham Bay, Bronx
Throggs Neck, Bronx
 Bay Ridge, Brooklyn
 Gerritsen Beach, Brooklyn
 Marine Park, Brooklyn
 Windsor Terrace, Brooklyn
 Vinegar Hill, Brooklyn
 Broad Channel, Queens
 Belle Harbor, Queens
 Breezy Point, Queens
 Rockaway Park, Queens
 Rockaway Beach, Queens
 Sunnyside, Queens
 Maspeth, Queens
 Woodside, Queens
 St. George, Staten Island
 West Brighton, Staten Island
 Randall Manor, Staten Island

Historic
 Five Points/Lower East Side, Manhattan
 Hell's Kitchen, Manhattan
 East Harlem, Manhattan
 Mott Haven, Bronx
 Inwood, Manhattan
 University Heights, Bronx
 Kingsbridge, Bronx
 Bainbridge, Bronx
 Bedford Park, Bronx
 Fordham, Bronx
Astoria, Queens 
 Woodhaven, Queens
 Parkchester, Bronx
 Westchester Square, Bronx

Notable Irish New Yorkers

Irish mayors 
 David Mathews
 James Duane
 William Jay Gaynor
 Thomas F. Gilroy, Irish-born
 William R. Grace, Irish-born
 Hugh J. Grant
 John F. Hylan
 John Purroy Mitchel
 John P. O'Brien
 William O'Dwyer, Irish-born
 Jimmy Walker
 Robert F. Wagner Jr. – his mother was from Cork

Irish Bishops of the Archdiocese of New York
 R. Luke Concanen, Irish-born
 John Connolly, Irish-born
 Terence Cooke
 Michael Corrigan
 Timothy Dolan
 Edward Egan
 John Farley, Irish-born
 Patrick Hayes
 John Joseph Hughes, Irish-born
 John McCloskey
 John Joseph O'Connor
 Francis Spellman

Irish Bishops of the Diocese of Brooklyn
 John Loughlin, Irish-born
 Charles Edward McDonnell
 Thomas Edmund Molloy
 Bryan Joseph McEntegart
 Robert J. Brennan

Notable Irish New Yorkers
 James L. Buckley, U.S. senator, federal judge
 William F. Buckley Jr., writer, editor of National Review
 William F. Buckley, Sr., oil baron
 Edward Burns, actor, writer, director
 Joseph Brennan, basketball player
 Jimmy Breslin, former New York Daily News and Newsday writer
 Robert De Niro, actor
 Matthew Broderick, actor
 Jimmy Burke, gangster
 James Cagney, actor
 Hugh Carey, Governor of New York
 George Carlin, comedian
 William Bourke Cockran, congressman and noted Tammany Hall orator
 George M Cohan, entertainer, playwright, composer, lyricist, actor, singer, dancer, and producer
 Mad Dog Coll, gangster
 Margaret Colin. actress
 James B. Comey, Former Director of the Federal Bureau of Investigation
 Jennifer Connelly, actress, model, Academy Award winner
 Kevin Connors, ESPN sportscaster
 James Coonan, gangster
 Gerry Cooney, boxer
 Bob Costas, sports broadcaster, television personality
 Kevin Corrigan, actor
 Charles Dolan, billionaire, owner of Cablevision, Madison Square Garden & Knicks
 James Dolan, billionaire, owner of New York Rangers & Radio City Music Hall
 William A. Donohue, president of the Catholic League
 Art Donovan, football player
 Charles J. Dougherty, president of Duquesne University
 Francis Patrick Duffy, priest, Lieutenant Colonel and chaplain of 69th Infantry Regiment (New York)
 Mike Dunleavy, Sr., basketball player, National Basketball Association head coach
 Bill Dwyer, gangster
 Mickey Featherstone, gangster
 Patrick Fitzgerald, United States Attorney
 Bobby Flay, chef, television host, restaurateur
 Charles V. Glasco, New York City Police Sergeant, most well known for his efforts to rescue John William Warde
 Jackie Gleason, comedian
 Pete Hamill, writer, editor in chief of New York Daily News & New York Post
 Henry Hill, gangster
 Charles J. Hynes District Attorney for Kings County
 Mychal F. Judge, OFM,  priest and Chaplain of the Fire Department of New York
 George W. Keller, architect
 Raymond W. Kelly, New York Police Department Commissioner
 Caroline Kennedy, author, attorney, daughter of President John F. Kennedy
 John F. Kennedy, Jr., son of John F. Kennedy, magazine editor
 George Kennedy, actor
 Owney Madden, gangster
 Michael Malloy, also known as Mike the Durable and Iron Mike, known for being "unkilliable"
 Dennis Hart Mahan, professor of military theory and engineering at West Point
 Alfred Thayer Mahan, influential naval historian
 Wellington Mara, owner of New York Giants, member of Pro Football Hall of Fame
 Jack McCarthy, WPIX broadcaster and kids show host.
 Frank McCourt, author, winner of Pulitzer Prize for literature
 Steven McDonald, NYPD Detective, public speaker, peace maker
 Brian McDonough Radio and Television personality, physician, author
 John McEnroe, tennis player, winner of seven Grand Slam tournaments
 Patrick McEnroe, tennis player
 Roderick McMahon, boxing and sports promoter
 Vincent J. McMahon owner of World Wrestling Entertainment, sports promoter
 Mary Tyler Moore, actress
 Daniel Patrick Moynihan, U.S. Senator
 Joe Mullen, hockey player
 Richard Mulligan, actor
 Chris Mullin, basketball player, member of 1992 Dream Team
 Conan O'Brien, late night talk show host
 John P. O'Brien, mayor of New York City
 Jerry O'Connell, actor
 Carroll O'Connor, actor
 Charles O'Conor, United States Attorney, former presidential candidate
 Rosie O'Donnell, actress, comedian
 Ryan O'Neal, actor
 Tatum O'Neal, actress
 James Aloysius O'Gorman one-term United States Senator from New York, Justice of the New York District Court, Justice of the New York Supreme Court
 Walter O'Malley, owner of Brooklyn Dodgers, infamous for moving them to Los Angeles
 Bill O'Reilly, news commentator
 Regis Philbin, television personality
 Colin Quinn, comedian
 Richard Riordan, former mayor of Los Angeles
 Al Smith, governor of New York, 1928 Democratic Party presidential candidate
 John Sweeney, president of the AFL–CIO
 Gene Tunney, boxer
 Jimmy Walker, mayor of New York City
Thomas J. Manton, U.S. Congress

Irish gangs 

 19th Street Gang
 40 Thieves
 Dead Rabbits
 Gopher Gang
 Grady Gang
 Kerryonians
 Slobbery Jim
 The Westies
 Whyos

Entertainment about Irish in New York City

Music
Fairytale of New York by Irish band The Pogues refers to the NYPD choir singing Galway Bay. This is traditional because the force traditionally was largely made up of Irish Americans.

Notable films
 The Last Dance, 1930
 Me and My Gal, 1932
 Mannequin, 1937
 Angels with Dirty Faces, 1938
 The Flying Irishman, 1939
 Waterfront, 1939
 Little Nellie Kelly, 1940
 East Side Kids, 1940
 The Fighting 69th, 1940
 Going My Way, 1944
 The Kid from Brooklyn, 1946
 My Wild Irish Rose, 1947
 The Lady from Shanghai, 1947
 The Luck of the Irish, 1948
 On the Waterfront, 1954
 Beau James, 1957
 Mad Dog Coll, 1961
 Madigan, 1968
 Quackser Fortune Has a Cousin in the Bronx, 1970
 State of Grace, 1990
 Q & A, 1990
 Goodfellas, 1990
 Mad Dog Coll, 1992
 The Brothers McMullen, 1995
 The Devil's Own, 1997
 Angela's Ashes, 1999
 Gangs of New York, 2002
 In America, 2002
 25th Hour, 2003
 Daredevil, 2003
 Emerald City, 2006
 Michael Clayton, 2007
 Brooklyn, 2015
 Run All Night, 2015

Television
 Blue Bloods, 2010
 The Black Donnellys, 2007
 CSI: NY, 2004
 Daredevil, 2015
 Rescue Me, 2004
 Grounded for Life, 2001
 The Job, 2001
 The Beat, 2000
 The King of Queens, 1999
 Trinity, 1998
 Brooklyn South, 1997
 Ryan's Hope, 1975
 Going My Way, 1962
 All in the Family, 1971
 Archie Bunker's Place, 1979
 Late Night with Conan O'Brien, 1993

Bibliography

References

Further reading

 Almeida, Linda Dowling. Irish Immigrants in New York City, 1945-1995 (Indiana University Press, 2001).
 Anbinder, Tyler. Five Points: The 19th-century New York City neighborhood that invented tap dance, stole elections, and became the world's most notorious slum (Simon and Schuster, 2001). online
 Anbinder, Tyler. "We will dirk every mother’s son of you- Five Points and the Irish conquest of New York Politics" Eire-Ireland (2001) 36(1): 29–46. excerpt
 Barrett, James R., and David R. Roediger. "The Irish and the 'Americanization' of the 'New Immigrants' in the Streets and in the Churches of the Urban United States, 1900-1930." Journal of American Ethnic History 24.4 (2005): 3-33. How the Irish helped the "new immigration" in New York City and Chicago. online
 Bayor, Ronald H., and Timothy Meagher, eds. The New York Irish (Johns Hopkins University Press, 1997) online; 22 topical essays by experts.
 Bayor, Ronald H. Neighbors in Conflict: The Irish, Germans, Jews, and Italians of New York City, 1929-1941 (U of Illinois Press, 1988). online
 Bernstein, Iver. The New York City Draft Riots: Their Significance for American Society and Politics in the Age of the Civil War (1990). 
 Burrows, Edwin G., and Mike Wallace. Gotham: A History of New York City to 1898 (Oxford University Press, 1999) 1383pp; a standard scholarly history.
 Carregal-Romero, José. "The Irish Female Migrant, Silence and Family Duty in Colm Tóibín’s Brooklyn." Études irlandaises 43-2 (2018): 129-141. online
 Cook, Adrian. The Armies of the Streets: The New York City Draft Riots of 1863 (University Press of Kentucky, 1974).
 Darby, Paul. "Gaelic games, ethnic identity and Irish nationalism in New York City c. 1880–1917." Sport in Society 10.3 (2007): 347-367.
 Dolan, Jay P.  The Immigrant Church: New York's Irish and German Catholics, 1815-1865 (1975) online
 Glazer, Nathan, and Daniel Patrick Moynihan. Beyond the Melting Pot: The Negroes, Puerto Ricans, Jews, Italians, and Irish of New York City (MIT Press, 1970). online
 Gordon, Michael Allen. The Orange Riots: Irish Political Violence in New York City, 1870 and 1871 (Cornell University Press, 1993). online
 Gurock, Jeffrey S. "'Getting Along' in Parkchester: A New Era in Jewish–Irish Relations in New York City 1940–1970." Religions 9.6 (2018): 181+ .
 Jackson, Kenneth T., ed. The encyclopedia of New York city (Yale University Press, 2010). online
 Joyce, Toby. "The New York Draft Riots of 1863: An Irish Civil War?" History Ireland (March 2003) 11#2, pp 22-27. online
 Kelly, Mary C. The shamrock and the lily: the New York Irish and the creation of a transatlantic identity, 1845-1921 (Peter Lang, 2005). online review
 McGlmpsey, Christopher D. "Internal ethnic friction: Orange and green in nineteenth‐century New York, 1868–1872." Immigrants & Minorities 1.1 (1982): 39-59.
 McGrath, Patrick. "Secular Power, Sectarian Politics: The American-Born Irish Elite and Catholic Political Culture in Nineteenth-Century New York." Journal of American Ethnic History 38.3 (2019): 36-75. online
 Marston, Sallie A. "Making difference: conflict over Irish identity in the New York City St. Patrick’s Day parade." Political Geography 21.3 (2002): 373-392. online
 Maye-Banbury, Angela. "Emerald City? The case for situational capital in advancing our understanding of Irish immigrants’ attachment to New York City as place." Irish Journal of Sociology (2022): 07916035221082548. online
 Moses, Paul. An unlikely union: The love-hate story of New York's Irish and Italians (NYU Press, 2017). online
 Nilsen, Kenneth E. "Irish in nineteenth century New York." in The Multilingual Apple: Languages in New York City (2002) pp: 53-69.
 O'Donnell, Edward T. "Hibernians Versus Hebrews? A New Look at the 1902 Jacob Joseph Funeral Riot" Journal of the Gilded Age and Progressive Era 6.2 (2007): 209-225.
 Rohs, Stephen Albert, and Stephen Rohs. Eccentric Nation: Irish Performance in Nineteenth-Century New York City (Fairleigh Dickinson Univ Press, 2009), regarding theatres
 Shelley, Thomas. " 'Only One Class of People to Draw Upon for Support': Irish-Americans and the Archdiocese of New York." American Catholic Studies (2001): 1-21.
 Winsberg, Morton D. "The Suburbanization of the Irish in Boston, Chicago and New-York." Eire-Ireland 21.3 (1986): 90-104.

External links

 FDNY Emerald Society
 FDNY Emerald Society Pipes and Drums
 Fordham University
 St. John's University
 New York Irish Bars
 NYCD Emerald Society
 New York Irish History Roundtable
 NYPD Emerald Society
 St. Patrick's Old Cathedral
 New York Irish Center
 Woodhaven House web site, with discussion of history of Irish pubs in Queens
 Winged Fist Organization

 
Ethnic groups in New York City